Angel García Delgado (10 October 1919 – 25 January 1996) was a Cuban sprinter who competed in the 1948 Summer Olympics. He finished second in the 1951 Pan American Games 4×100 metre relay (with Rafael Fortún, Raúl Mazorra, and Jesús Farrés). García also finished fifth in the 1951 Pan American Games 400 metres.

Competition record

References

1919 births
1996 deaths
Cuban male sprinters
Olympic athletes of Cuba
Athletes (track and field) at the 1948 Summer Olympics
Athletes (track and field) at the 1952 Summer Olympics
Pan American Games medalists in athletics (track and field)
Pan American Games silver medalists for Cuba
Athletes (track and field) at the 1951 Pan American Games
Athletes (track and field) at the 1955 Pan American Games
Medalists at the 1951 Pan American Games
Central American and Caribbean Games medalists in athletics
20th-century Cuban people